Jaime Ravinet de la Fuente (born 17 October 1946), is a Chilean politician, lawyer, academic and businessman. From 1990 to 2000 he was Mayor of Santiago, before becoming the Minister for Housing, Urban Planning and National Property in 2001, a position he held until 2004. He then became the Minister for Defence until 11 March 2006. In February 2010 he was re-appointed as Minister of Defence by president-elect Sebastián Piñera but Ravinet resigned on January 13, 2011 after suggesting that the Chilean armed forces might be reluctant to help during humanitarian crises if that forced them to provide information about their expenses.

He was born into a middle-class family, the eldest son of engineer Alfredo Ravinet and Alicia de la Fuente Larenas, who was Ravinet's second wife. He was educated at Santiago College, San Ignacio College and finally the University of Chile, where he studied law. He married political scientist Ximena Lyon Parot in January 1974, and has three children - Raul, Ximena and Macarena.

References

External links 

1946 births
Living people
Mayors of Santiago
University of Chile alumni
Johns Hopkins University alumni
Presidents of the University of Chile Student Federation
20th-century Chilean lawyers
Christian Democratic Party (Chile) politicians
Chilean Ministers of Defense
Housing ministers of Chile
Urban planning ministers of Chile